Elizabeth Kent ('Bessy') (1791–1861) was a nineteenth century British writer on botanical and horticultural matters.

Life
The younger sister of Marianne Kent, the future wife of Leigh Hunt, the English critic and writer, it was Bess who initially drew Hunt into the family circle through her youthful admiration for his work. Through her brother-in-law, Hunt, for whom she acted as agent and amanuensis, she belonged to a circle (the Cockney School) of contemporary writers including Byron, Coleridge, Mary Shelley, and John Clare. Her closeness to Hunt and her ambivalent position in her sister's household led to much contemporary gossip: it may be significant that it was only after her breach with the household in 1822 that Bess was able to emerge as a writer in her own right.

Kent never married.

Works
Her best known work, Flora Domestica, quoting extensively from Hunt and Keats, was published anonymously in 1823, and incorrectly attributed to Henry Phillips by F. W. Burbidge in his work on Narcissus (1875). Other works include New Tales for Young Readers (1822) and Sylvan Sketches (1825). She wrote for the Magazine of Natural History, taught botany and wrote books for children.

See also
Benjamin Robert Haydon

References

Bibliography 

Sylvan Sketches, or a Companion to the Park and the Shrubbery, with Illustrations from the Works of the Poets. London, Taylor and Hessey, 1825
  (also available as pdf)
Jeffrey N. Cox, Poetry and Politics in the Cockney School: Keats, Shelley, Hunt and their Circle. Cambridge: Cambridge University Press, 1998. .

1791 births
1861 deaths
19th-century British writers
19th-century British women writers
Amanuenses
British botanical writers